Kit Carson is a 1940 Western film directed by George B. Seitz and  starring Jon Hall as Kit Carson, Lynn Bari as Delores Murphy, and Dana Andrews as Captain John C. Frémont  . This picture was filmed on location at Cayente (Kayenta), Arizona and was one of the early films to use Monument Valley as a backdrop. The supporting cast features Ward Bond as a character named "Ape", future Lone Ranger Clayton Moore without his mask, and Raymond Hatton as Jim Bridger.

Plot summary

Kit Carson (Jon Hall) and his two saddle pals, Ape (Ward Bond) and Lopez (Harold Huber) are attacked by Indians. They manage to escape unscathed and make their way to Fort Bridger, where Captain John Fremont (Dana Andrews) hires Carson to guide a wagon train westward to California south along the Oregon Trail. Both Carson and Fremont fall in love with pretty Dolores Murphy (Lynn Bari), on her way to her father's hacienda in Monterey. Meanwhile, General Castro (C. Henry Gordon), the Mexican Governor General of California, arms the Shoshoni Indians in an effort to keep the Americans out of California.

Cast
 Jon Hall as Kit Carson  
 Lynn Bari as Dolores Murphy  
 Dana Andrews as Captain John C. Frémont  
 Harold Huber as Lopez  
 Ward Bond as Ape  
 Renie Riano as Miss Pilchard  
 Clayton Moore as Paul Terry  
 Rowena Cook as Alice Terry  
 Raymond Hatton as Jim Bridger  
 Harry Strang as Sergeant Clanahan  
 C. Henry Gordon as General José Castro  
 Lew Merrill as General Mariano Guadalupe Vallejo   
 Stanley Andrews as Thomas O. Larkin  
 Edwin Maxwell as John Sutter  
 George Lynn as James King (as Peter Lynn)
 William Farnum as Don Miguel Murphy

Production
The movie was one of several Edward Small made for United Artists. Victor McLaglen was originally announced for the title role, and then Randolph Scott. Joel McCrea and Henry Fonda were also named.

Jon Hall had just made South of Pago Pago for Edward Small and was borrowed from Samuel Goldwyn Productions. Lynn Bari was borrowed from 20th Century Fox. Filming started on March 10, 1940. It was shot on location in Kayenta, Arizona.

The film was later remade as Frontier Uprising (1961).

Reception
Filmink felt that Hall was not comfortable in the lead role but the film was "saved by its production values and support cast".

References

External links 
 
 
 
 

1940 films
1940s biographical films
1940 Western (genre) films
American biographical films
American black-and-white films
1940s English-language films
Films directed by George B. Seitz
Films shot in Arizona
United Artists films
Films produced by Edward Small
American Western (genre) films
Cultural depictions of Kit Carson
Films scored by Edward Ward (composer)
1940s American films